The list of shipwrecks in 2005 includes ships sunk, foundered, grounded, or otherwise lost during 2005.

January

9 January

15 January

February

7 February

9 February

March

15 March

23 March

25 March

April

16 April

22 April

May

4 May

14 May

15 May

17 May

19 May

June

16 June

22 June

23 June

July

2 July

 She was refloated, towed to a site in the Pacific Ocean northwest of the atoll, and scuttled on 4 August 2005.

31 July

August

3 August

4 August

10 August

22 August

25 August

26 August

Unknown date

September

2 September

6 September

12 September

October

10 October

14 October

November

12 November

13 November

Unknown date

December

9 December

20 December

Unknown date

References

External links
Vessel Casualties & Pirates Database 2005

2005
 
Ship